Antonio Thomas (born 21 October 1982) is a Barbadian cricketer. He played in eight first-class matches for the Barbados cricket team from 2001 to 2005.

See also
 List of Barbadian representative cricketers

References

External links
 

1982 births
Living people
Barbadian cricketers
Barbados cricketers
People from Saint James, Barbados